Ryongnamsan Sports Club (Chosŏn'gŭl: 룡남산체육단; Hanja: 龍南山體育團) is a North Korean multi-sports club based in P'yŏngyang and affiliated with Kim Il-sung University. They play football in the DPR Korea League. Ryongnamsan is a mountain in Pyongyang near Kim Il Sung University which is often equated.

In addition to football, the club has handball teams.

References

Football clubs in North Korea